Tai Tzu-ying (born 20 June 1994) is a Taiwanese badminton player. At the age of 22, she became world No. 1 in the women's singles in December 2016, and she is the women's singles player who has held that title for the longest in BWF history, with 213 weeks (as of 2 May 2022). Tai was the women's singles silver medalist in the Tokyo 2020 Olympics and the gold medalist in 2017 Summer Universiade and at the 2018 Asian Games. She has won the year-end tournament BWF Superseries/World Tour Finals three times, and the All England Open thrice as of 2020. She has also won back-to-back Asian Championships titles.

Career 
Tai's career began when she was in elementary school, as she was influenced by her father who was a firefighter and the director of Kaohsiung city's badminton committee. Tai started playing badminton in the fourth or fifth grade of elementary school, and in the sixth grade, she played at the National ranking tournament, won the title in the second division, and earning the right to participate in the first division games. She was the youngest player to compete in the first division.

2007–2010: Early international career 
Tai made her debut in an international tournament in 2007 Vietnam International. In 2009, she won the silver medal at the Asian Junior Championships, losing the final match to Chen Xiaojia in straight games. She represented Kaohsiung City in the National Games and went into the quarter-finals. Young Tai began to show her potential when she was 15 years old, as she was able to compete at the senior level and become runner-up at the Vietnam Open a Grand Prix tournament. In December, Tai competed at the East Asian Games for Chinese Taipei, won a bronze medal in the women's singles and helped the team reach the final, settling for a silver medal.

In 2010, she entered the big stage by competing in the Superseries event in Korea Open. In April, she participated at the World Junior Championships in Mexico, but had to retire in the quarter-finals of 9–16 places due to injury. In June, she experienced the most memorable thing during her career as a badminton player, when she reached her first Superseries final on her birthday in Singapore Open. She started in the qualifying draw and went on to reach the final, which she lost to Saina Nehwal in straight games.

2011–2013: First Grand Prix and Superseries title 
In 2011, Tai made good progress by defeating the top ranked player. She defeated Zhu Lin in the first round of the Australian Open, Wang Xin in the first round of Indonesia Open, and in July, she beat the former world champion Lu Lan in the quarter-finals of the U.S. Open which was a Grand Prix Gold tournament, and beat World Junior silver medalists Sayaka Sato in the final, which became the first international title she won at the age of 17. She also reached the semi-finals of the Canada, Vietnam, and French Open, where in France, she defeated China's number 1 Wang Shixian in the quarter-finals.

In the early half of 2012 season, her best achievements were the reaching the semi-finals in the All England Open, and ranked as world number 16. Tai represented her country as the second women's singles behind Cheng Shao-chieh at the 2012 Summer Olympics in London. The 18-year-old, ranked 13th in the world and seeded 10th won all matches in the group stage defeating Anu Nieminen of Finland and Victoria Montero of Mexico. Her pace at the Olympics was stopped by the eventual gold medalist from China Li Xuerui in the round of 16. In September, she claimed her first Superseries title in the Japan Open and made history as the youngest player to win a Superseries title (currently the third youngest player, after Ratchanok Intanon who won the India Open in 2013, and Akane Yamaguchi who won the Japan Open in 2013). She was expected to near the upper echelons and future of the women's game by her victory in Japan and increasingly impressive performances by significant wins over some of the top players. In October, she won the Chinese Taipei Open against Lindaweni Fanetri in a close rubber games 21–19, 20–22, 22–20. In November, she competed as the top-seeded player at the World Junior Championships in Chiba, Japan, but fell in the quarter-finals to Sun Yu.

In August 2013, she was recruited by the team Banga Beats to play for them in the Indian Badminton League. In the 2013 BWF Super Series Masters Finals, she defeated Sung Ji-hyun and Porntip Buranaprasertsuk but lost to Wang Shixian. She made it to the semifinals and successfully avenged her loss, beating Wang Shixian. She ended second after losing the final to Li Xuerui.

2014–2015: Asian bronze and Superseries Finals title 
Tai represented her country at the 2014 Asian Games and won Taiwan's first badminton medal by finishing as the third place. She won the Hong Kong Open in 2014 after beating Nozomi Okuhara of Japan in straight games, 21–19, 21–11. She extended her winning streak to the Superseries Finals in Dubai and won the first title for Taiwan in the Superseries finals by beating Korea's Sung Ji-hyun in straight games.

In 2015, she was beaten by Sun Yu in the Singapore Open. She did not win any titles that year.

2016: World #1 
In 2016, Tai won the Indonesia Open and the Hong Kong Open to reach World No. 1 for the first time in her career. She won the Superseries Finals in Dubai for the second time, becoming the second women's singles player to do so (after Li Xuerui in 2012 and 2013). She also made history by becoming the first women's singles player to reach the finals in the Superseries Finals three times.

2017: Asian champion and fifth straight Superseries title 
Before the 2017 season started, Tai announced that she would skip that year's World Championships in Glasgow. Tai decided to attend the 2017 Summer Universiade not only out of a desire to earn a title for her home country but also for the bigger picture. Since the Summer Universiade was by far the biggest sporting event held in her home country, only second to the Olympic Games, Tai wanted to welcome the world to see Taiwan. President Tsai commended Tai's decision. She won the Special Contribution Award in 2017 Sports Elite Awards.

Tai won her first All England Open title in March 2017, beating Ratchanok Intanon in the finals. In April, Tai won the Malaysia Open as well as the Singapore Open beating Carolina Marín in the finals two times in two weeks. Her titles in Malaysia and Singapore were her fourth and fifth consecutive ones. Later in April, she won another title against Akane Yamaguchi in the Asian Championships held in Wuhan, China, marking a sixth consecutive title. It was also the first gold medal for Taiwan in this competition.

After winning 3 matches for her country in the 2017 Sudirman Cup, Tai extended her winning streak to 27 matches, before losing to Thailand's Nitchaon Jindapol in the quarter-finals.

2018–2019: Asian Games gold, second All England and Asian Champions 

In 2018, Tai started the season by participating in the Malaysian Master in which she defeated Chen Yufei in the quarter-final and Carolina Marín in a thrilling semi-final, coming from a game down, but lost to Ratchanok Intanon in the final. A week later, at the Indonesia Masters, she won the title after defeating Saina Nehwal of India.

Due to tournament rescheduling, Tai could not defend her 2017 Singapore Open title and lost the world number 1 ranking to Japan's Akane Yamaguchi. But in her next tournament, the Asian Championships, she won the title after defeating Chen Yufei in the final in Wuhan and regained her world no 1 ranking.

In the 2018 BWF World Championship's third round, she defeated Beiwen Zhang from the United States in straight games (21–19, 21–14) and broke the record of the longest winning streak with 31 consecutive matches won (Indonesia Masters, All England Open, Asian Championships, Uber Cup, Malaysia Open, Indonesia Open, BWF World Championships), while the former record of 30 wins was held by Li Xuerui from China. However, she then lost in the next round to China's He Bingjiao 18–21, 21–7, 13–21.

In the 2018 Asian Games, held in Jakarta, she won the gold medal by beating P. V. Sindhu in straight games in the final, which became her first big title in her career. After crowning the women's singles' title of 2018 Denmark Open, her ranking points reached 101,517. She became the second player in the women's singles category to break 100,000 points, while the first was Li Xuerui from China, who led the points by 101,644. Although she lost the final game of the 2018 French Open, she still won 9,350 points, by deleting her 2017 French Open 9,200 points, her points came to 101,667 eventually, becoming the highest points holder in the women's singles category history. Tai qualified to compete at the World Tour Finals and was placed as the top seed. In the group stage, she was placed in Group A along with Akane Yamaguchi, P. V. Sindhu and Beiwen Zhang. In her first match, she defeated Zhang 21–15, 21–17; lost to Sindhu 21–14, 16–21, 18–21. However, she retired with an injury in her third group stage match against Yamaguchi after losing the first game 17–21 and trailing 12–11 in the second game. Tai did not reveal the nature of the injury or how it occurred.

In 2019, she reached the quarter-final stage of the Malaysia Masters, losing to the same opponent of last year and arch-rival Ratchanok Intanon in straight games. In March, she advanced to the final of the All England Open for the third straight time, however she unexpectedly lost to the Chinese Chen Yufei, after 11 straight victories over her. She came back and claimed back to back titles at the Malaysia Open and Singapore Open; beating the Japanese Akane Yamaguchi and Nozomi Okuhara respectively in the finals in straight games. In July, she was unable to defend her title at the Indonesia Open, after losing in the semi-finals to Akane Yamaguchi. Her jinx at the World Championships continued further after she lost to P. V. Sindhu of India in the quarter-finals in 3 games 21–12, 21–23, 19–21. This was her 5th straight quarter-final loss at the World Championships.

She reached the final of the China Open, where she lost to insurgent Carolina Marín in three games. She reached the semi-finals of the Korea Open. She claimed her third title of the year at the Denmark Open further defending her title there. She beat Nozomi Okuhara in straight games.

She continued her good form and reached the semi-finals of the French Open and Fuzhou China Open. She competed at the World Tour Finals. In the group stage, she beat Ratchanok Intanon and Busanan Ongbamrungphan, and assured herself of a semi-final spot. She avenged her loss in the Group Stage to Nozomi Okuhara in the semi-final and reached the final again after three years. Despite a good performance, she couldn't stand right against Chen Yufei and lost the final with 21–12, 12–21, 17–21 scoreline.

2020–2021: Third All England title and BWF Female Player of the Year 
Tai commenced the year by competing at the Malaysia Masters as the first seed. She finished as runner-up after losing to Chen Yufei in straight games. In her fourth straight All England Open final this year, she won the coveted title for the third time, thereby becoming only the second female player after Ye Zhaoying (1996–99) to clinch three titles by contesting 4 consecutive finals in this tournament. In the final, she beat Chen Yufei with the score of 21–19, 21–15, with this, she avenged her last year's defeat to Chen at this stage. She had to settle for the second best at the two consecutive Thailand Open super 1000 events in January, 2021 after losing to Carolina Marín in both occasions in straight games. She finally defeated Marín at the BWF World Tour Finals while contesting her 5th end-of-season championships final, and winning it for the third time. She claimed victory over her opponent in three games. Tai has been named the BWF Female Player of the Year 2020–2021.
Tai Tzu Ying won the All England 2020 and then struck a rich vein of form at the three-tournament Asian Leg in January 2021, making all three finals, and clinching the BWF World Tour Finals 2020. Tai then made the final of the Tokyo Olympics, and won a silver medal after being defeated by the top seed Chen Yufei in an intense match, 18–21, 21–19, 18–21.

Playing style 
Tai plays an offensive game, with many calling her style unpredictable and often spontaneous. She is a very adventurous player with a disguised nature of shots, seemingly able to hit the shuttle from just about anywhere with a great range of shots and angles. Also remarkable is her very relaxed hitting action.

She has a strong backhand and good net-play, while her biggest fault is being inconsistent at times. Tai also has strong stamina and is very athletic.
Tai herself said that she does not follow a certain play or style, and focuses on herself rather than her opponent or any strategies. Tai has clocked fast smashes, with one of the fastest recorded being 360 km/h at the 2016 All England Open quarter-finals, despite her preference of playing slowly to set up shots.

Tai's prodigious talent and deceptive shot-making has earned compliments of many, including BWF commentator Gillian Clark, who often compliments her talented shot-making and has said that Tai is one of the best players to watch in women's singles.

Achievements

Olympic Games 
Women's singles

BWF World Championships 
Women's singles

Asian Games 
Women's singles

Asian Championships 
Women's singles

East Asian Games 
Women's singles

Summer Universiade 
Women's singles

World University Championships 
Women's singles

Women's doubles

Asian Junior Championships 
Girls' singles

BWF World Tour (14 titles, 9 runners-up) 
The BWF World Tour, which was announced on 19 March 2017 and implemented in 2018, is a series of elite badminton tournaments sanctioned by the Badminton World Federation (BWF). The BWF World Tour is divided into levels of World Tour Finals, Super 1000, Super 750, Super 500, Super 300, and the BWF Tour Super 100.

Women's singles

BWF Superseries (12 titles, 6 runners-up) 
The BWF Superseries, which was launched on 14 December 2006 and implemented in 2007, was a series of elite badminton tournaments, sanctioned by the Badminton World Federation (BWF). BWF Superseries levels were Superseries and Superseries Premier. A season of Superseries consisted of twelve tournaments around the world that had been introduced since 2011. Successful players were invited to the Superseries Finals, which were held at the end of each year.

Women's singles

  BWF Superseries Finals tournament
  BWF Superseries Premier tournament
  BWF Superseries tournament

BWF Grand Prix (3 titles, 2 runners-up) 
The BWF Grand Prix had two levels, the Grand Prix and Grand Prix Gold. It was a series of badminton tournaments sanctioned by the Badminton World Federation (BWF) and played between 2007 and 2017.

Women's singles

  BWF Grand Prix Gold tournament
  BWF Grand Prix tournament

Invitation tournament 
Mixed doubles

Performance timeline

Women's singles 

1 Doesn't count in official record.

Women's doubles

Mixed doubles

Record against selected opponents 
Record against Year-end Finals finalists, World Championships semi-finalists, and Olympic quarter-finalists. Accurate as of 30 October 2022.

Sponsorships

Yonex controversy 
During the period of the 2016 Summer Olympics, Yonex provided unfit shoes to non-contract Tai. This forced Tai to wear other shoes made by her personal sponsor brand, Victor, without any logos. This event caused a controversy with the Chinese Taipei Badminton Association.

Note

References

External links 

 
 
  
Tai Tzu-Ying on Instagram

1994 births
Living people
Sportspeople from Kaohsiung
Taiwanese female badminton players
Badminton players at the 2012 Summer Olympics
Badminton players at the 2016 Summer Olympics
Olympic badminton players of Taiwan
Badminton players at the 2014 Asian Games
Badminton players at the 2018 Asian Games
Asian Games gold medalists for Chinese Taipei
Asian Games bronze medalists for Chinese Taipei
Asian Games medalists in badminton
Medalists at the 2014 Asian Games
Medalists at the 2018 Asian Games
Universiade gold medalists for Chinese Taipei
Universiade silver medalists for Chinese Taipei
Universiade bronze medalists for Chinese Taipei
Universiade medalists in badminton
World No. 1 badminton players
Medalists at the 2013 Summer Universiade
Medalists at the 2015 Summer Universiade
Medalists at the 2017 Summer Universiade
Badminton players at the 2020 Summer Olympics
Medalists at the 2020 Summer Olympics
Olympic silver medalists for Taiwan
Olympic medalists in badminton
21st-century Taiwanese women